Country All the Way is an album recorded by Kitty Wells and released in 1966 on the Decca label (DL 4776) in the United States and on the Brunswick label (LAT 8659) in the United Kingdom.

The album included "Meanwhile, Down at Joe's", a song that peaked at No. 9 on the Billboard country chart. It was Wells' final top 10 hit.

The album opening track, "A Woman Half My Age", was also a hit, peaking at No. 15 on the Billboard country chart in February 1966.

Wells was accompanied on the album by the Jordanaires. Thom Owens of Allmusic called it a strong album with an excellent selection of songs.

Track listing

References

1966 albums
Kitty Wells albums